Kwartalnik Historyczny is a Polish history journal. It was established in 1887 in Lwów and is the oldest extant national journal for history. The founder of Kwartalnik Historyczny was Ksawery Liske.

Editors 
Ksawery Liske (1887-1891)
Oswald Balzer (1891-1894)
Aleksander Semkowicz (1895-1898, 1899-1904, 1906–1914, 1920-1922)
Józef Korzeniowski (1898-1899)
Ludwik Finkel (1918-1919)
Franciszek Bujak (1930-1931)
Kazimierz Tyszkowski (1937-1940)
Roman Grodecki (1945-1947)
Kazimierz Lepszy (1945-1946)
Jan Konstanty Dąbrowski
Stanisław Arnold (1950-1952)
Bogusław Leśnodorski (1953-1974)
Tadeusz Jędruszczak (from 1975)
Jerzy Michalski (1985-1999)
Wojciech Kriegseisen
Roman Michałowski

References

Bibliography

External links 
 Kwartalnik Historyczny. Vol: 1-53 (1887-1939)
 Kwartalnik Historyczny. Vol: 53-59 (1939-1952)
Kwartalnik Historyczny. Vol. since 60 (1953)

Publications established in 1887
History journals
Polish-language journals
Quarterly journals
Academic journals published in Poland